A Dahlander motor  (also known as a pole changing motor, dual- or two speed-motor) is a type of multispeed three-phase  induction motor, in which the speed of the motor is varied by altering the number of poles; this is achieved by altering the wiring connections inside the motor. The motor may have fixed or variable torque depending on the stator winding. It is named after its inventor Robert Dahlander (1870–1935).

Invention

Robert Dahlander, a Swedish engineer working for ASEA, discovered that switching the poles in a motor led to a reduction in the speed of the motor. In 1897 he invented an electrical configuration to switch between poles in a motor for which he was granted a patent along with his co-worker Karl Arvid Lindström. The new connection was named the "Dahlander connection" and a motor having such a configuration is commonly referred to as a "pole changing motor" or a "Dahlander motor".

Operation

The Dahlander motor is based on a 'consequent pole' connection. The primary factor in determining the speed of an induction motor is the number of poles, given by the formula
 (RPM)
where
ns = Synchronous speed, in revolutions per minute
f = AC power frequency
p = Number of poles per phase winding 
A regular induction motor has an equal number of opposite poles; that is, at any instant, there are an equal number of North and South magnetic poles. Some smaller induction motors are connected so that all the poles are identical, causing the motor to act as though there is an equal number of opposite poles in between.

A Dahlander motor achieves different speeds by switching the configuration of the electrical windings, indirectly adding or removing poles and thus varying the rotor speed. The poles can be varied at a ratio of 1:2 and thus the speed can be varied at 2:1. Normally, the electrical configuration of windings is varied from a delta connection (Δ) to a double star connection (YY) configuration in order to change the speed of the motor for constant torque applications, such as the hoists in cranes. Star connections (Y) varied to double star connections (YY) are used for quadratic torque applications, such as pumps.

Advantages and disadvantages
Dahlander motors have advantages compared to other speed control systems like variable frequency drives, as there is less power loss. This is because most of the power is used to drive the motor and no electrical pulse switching is done. The system is much simpler and easier to use compared to other speed control methods available. However, the Dahlander motor has the disadvantage of fast mechanical wear and tear due to changing speeds in such a drastic ratio; this type of connection also produces high harmonic distortion during the shifting of poles as the angular distance between the power generated increases as the poles are decreased in the motor.

Application
Pole changing motors are normally used in applications where two speed controls are necessary. Some typical applications are:
Pumps, wherein two speeds can be used to control the output flow 
Fans, to get variable air flow output
Crushers 
Milling applications
Cranes, where two speeds can be used in hoisting applications: one speed for material movement and the other for positioning the material held in the hoist

See also

 Induction motor   
 AC motor
 Variable-frequency drive 
 Variable-speed air compressor
 Vector control (motor)

References

Motor control
Electric motors
Electric power systems components
Electric power conversion
Mechanical power transmission
Mechanical power control
Electrical power control
Swedish inventions